Jazz Guitarist is a solo studio album by jazz guitarist Ted Dunbar that was released by Xanadu in 1982.

Track listing
"Winding Blues" - 4:05  (Ted Dunbar)
"Total Conversion" - 6:05  (Dunbar)
"Trees and Grass and Things" - 4:07  (Don Pullen)
"Nica's Dream" - 06:25  (Horace Silver)
"Hi-Fly" - 5:50  (Randy Weston)
"Bougie" - 7:55  (Dunbar)
"Epistrophy" - 6:45  (Thelonious Monk, Kenny Clarke)

Personnel 
 Ted Dunbar – guitar

References

1975 albums
Ted Dunbar albums
Xanadu Records albums